The Flyweight competition at the 2013 AIBA World Boxing Championships was held from 14–26 October 2013. Boxers are limited to a maximum of 52 kilograms in body mass.

Medalists

Seeds

  Andrew Selby (semifinals)
  Misha Aloyan (champion)
  Elías Emigdio (second round)
  Jasurbek Latipov (final)
  Paddy Barnes (quarterfinals)
  Elvin Mamishzade (quarterfinals)
  Vincenzo Picardi (second round)
  Ilyas Suleimenov (quarterfinals)
  Azat Usenaliev (third round)
  Geraldo Pérez (second round)

Draw

Finals

Top half

Section 1

Section 2

Bottom half

Section 3

Section 4

References
 Draw

2013 AIBA World Boxing Championships